The Mbakaou Power Station is an operational  mini hydroelectric power station in Cameroon.
Commercially commissioned in December 2021, the renewable energy project was jointly developed by the Government of Cameroon, in collaboration with IED Invest, an independent power producer (IPP) based in France, and Eneo Cameroon S.A., the Cameroonian national electric distribution parastatal company. The power generated at this power plant, amounting to 11.2 GWh annually, is sold to Eneo Cameroon, under a 20-year power purchase agreement, and is distributed to an estimated  40,000 people in the Adamawa Province of Cameroon.

Location
The power station is located across the Djérem River, which is a tributary of the Sanaga River, in the town of Mbakaou, in Djérem Department, in Cameroon's Adamawa Province.

Overview
The installed capacity at this mini hydro installation is two 0.74 MW Kaplan type turbines, for maximum capacity of 1.48 megawatts. The power station is owned by 
IED Invest, an IPP headquartered in Francheville, France. The power generated here is sold to Eneo Cameroon, the national public electric utility company.

History
Construction began in September 2019. The completed mini hydro installation was commercially commissioned in December 2021.

Construction costs and funding
The construction cost was reported as €6.8 million million. Funding for the project was sourced from the European Union, French Facility for Global Environment and the BGFIBank Group, headquartered in Libreville, Gabon.

Other consideration
There is a possibility of increasing capacity at this power station in the future, to 2.8 megawatts.

See also

List of power stations in Cameroon

References

External links
Location of Mbakaou Hydroelectric Power Station

Hydroelectric power stations in Cameroon
Energy infrastructure completed in 2021
2021 establishments in Cameroon
Buildings and structures in Cameroon
Renewable energy power stations in Cameroon